Isis and Osiris are two ancient Egyptian deities.

Isis and Osiris may also refer to:

new Canadian opera "Isis and Osiris, Gods of by composer Peter-Anthony Togni and librettist Sharon Singer

The Osiris myth, in which Isis and Osiris are central characters
De Iside et Osiride, an essay on ancient Egyptian religion by Plutarch, included in his collection Moralia
"O Isis und Osiris", an aria in the opera The Magic Flute
The second track on Ayreon's third album Into the Electric Castle